Dawkins' God: Genes, Memes, and the Meaning of Life is a book by Alister McGrath, a theologian who is currently Professor of Historical Theology at Oxford University. The book, published in 2004, with a second edition in 2015, aims to refute claims about religion made by another well-known professor at Oxford, Richard Dawkins. McGrath's book does not seek to demonstrate how Dawkins’ claims differ from Christianity, rather, it argues that Dawkins' arguments fall far short of the logical and evidence-based reasoning that Dawkins himself espouses.

Synopsis
McGrath begins with an overview of evolutionary biology and Darwinian theory. He then presents Dawkins' view that the current state of scientific knowledge should lead a rational person to conclude that there is no God. McGrath argues that Dawkins fails to declare or defend several crucial assumptions or premises. McGrath also defends other conclusions in the book, including:

 the scientific method cannot conclusively prove that God does or does not exist;
 the theory of evolution does not necessarily entail any particular atheistic, agnostic, or Christian understanding of the world;
 Dawkins' refutation of William Paley's watchmaker analogy does not equate to a refutation of God’s existence;
 Dawkins' proposal that memes explain the evolutionary development of human culture is more illogical and unscientific than a clearly articulated defence of Christianity;
 Dawkins is ignorant of Christian theology and mischaracterizes religious people generally.

McGrath argues that Dawkins' rejection of faith is a straw man argument. According to McGrath, Dawkins’ definition that faith “means blind trust, in the absence of evidence” is not a Christian position. In contrast, argues McGrath, accepting Dawkins’ definition would require blind trust since he offers no evidence to support it. Rather, it is based upon what McGrath calls “an unstated and largely unexamined cluster of hidden non-scientific values and beliefs” (p. 92). McGrath then argues that Dawkins frequently violates the very tenets of evidence-based reasoning that Dawkins himself claims to uphold and use to dismiss all religious belief.

Also on page 92, McGrath states "... Darwinism neither proves nor disproves the existence of God (unless, of course God is defined by his critics in precisely such a way...)."

Reception
In Science the sceptic Michael Shermer, reviewing this book, says

Response from Dawkins
In response to the book in general, and to the accusation of being ignorant of Christian theology in particular, Richard Dawkins stated:

References

2004 non-fiction books
Books by Alister McGrath
Criticism of atheism
Richard Dawkins
Religious studies books
Books about religion and science
Books about meaning of life